Prague-East District is a district in the Central Bohemian Region of the Czech Republic. Its capital is Prague. The most populated town of the district is Brandýs nad Labem-Stará Boleslav.

Administrative division
Prague-East District is divided into two administrative districts of municipalities with extended competence: Brandýs nad Labem-Stará Boleslav and Říčany.

List of municipalities
Towns are marked in bold and market towns in italics:

Babice -
Bašť -
Borek - 
Bořanovice -
Brandýs nad Labem-Stará Boleslav -
Brázdim -
Březí -
Čelákovice -
Černé Voděrady -
Čestlice -
Dobročovice -
Dobřejovice -
Doubek -
Dřevčice -
Dřísy -
Herink -
Hlavenec -
Horoušany -
Hovorčovice -
Hrusice -
Husinec -
Jenštejn -
Jevany -
Jirny -
Kaliště -
Kamenice -
Káraný -
Klecany -
Klíčany -
Klokočná -
Konětopy -
Konojedy -
Kostelec u Křížků -
Kostelec nad Černými lesy -
Kostelní Hlavno -
Kozojedy - 
Křenek -
Křenice -
Křížkový Újezdec -
Kunice -
Květnice -
Lázně Toušeň -
Lhota -
Líbeznice -
Louňovice -
Máslovice -
Měšice -
Mirošovice -
Mnichovice -
Modletice -
Mochov -
Mratín -
Mukařov -
Nehvizdy -
Nová Ves -
Nový Vestec -
Nučice - 
Nupaky -
Odolena Voda -
Oleška - 
Ondřejov -
Oplany - 
Panenské Břežany -
Pětihosty -
Petříkov -
Podolanka -
Polerady -
Popovičky -
Předboj -
Přezletice -
Prusice - 
Radějovice -
Radonice -
Říčany -
Sedlec -
Senohraby -
Šestajovice -
Sibřina -
Škvorec -
Sluhy -
Sluštice -
Strančice -
Struhařov -
Stříbrná Skalice - 
Sudovo Hlavno - 
Sulice -
Štíhlice -
Svémyslice -
Světice -
Svojetice -
Tehov -
Tehovec -
Úvaly -
Veleň -
Veliká Ves -
Velké Popovice -
Větrušice -
Vlkančice - 
Vodochody -
Všestary -
Vyšehořovice -
Výžerky -
Vyžlovka - 
Zápy -
Záryby - 
Zdiby -
Zeleneč -
Zlatá -
Zlonín -
Zvánovice

Geography

The territory of the district forms an atypical shape, surrounding Prague from the east. The landscpae is rather flat and agricultural, only the southeast is more hilly and forested. It extends into four geomorphological mesoregions: Central Elbe Table (north), Prague Plateau (northwest and central parts), Benešov Uplands (south) and Jizera Table (small northernmost part).

The most important river is the Elbe, which flows through the northern part of the district. The Vltava briefly forms the district border in the northwest. The territory is rather poor in bodies of water, the exception is a set of eight ponds on the Jevanský Stream.

There are no large-scale protected areas.

Demographics
Thanks to its proximity to Prague, Prague-East District belongs to the fastest growing districts in the country in the 21st century.

Most populated municipalities

Economy
The largest employers with its headquarters in Prague-East District and at least 1,000 employers are:

Transport
The territory of the district is crossed by several motorways leading from Prague: the D1 motorway to Brno, the D8 motorway to Ústí nad Labem, the D10 motorway to Turnov, and the D11 motorway to Hradec Králové. Small part of the D0 motorway also passes through the district.

Sights

The most important monuments in the district, protected as national cultural monuments are (all located in Brandýs nad Labem-Stará Boleslav):
Church of the Assumption of the Virgin Mary
Church of Saint Wenceslaus and Church of Saint Clement
Brandýs nad Labem Castle
Palladium of the Bohemian land in the Church of the Assumption of the Virgin Mary

The best-preserved settlements, protected as monument zones, are:
Brandýs nad Labem
Kostelec nad Černými lesy
Lensedly
Ondřejov
Stará Boleslav

The most visited tourist destination and one of the most visited destinations in the entire country is Aquapalace Prague in Čestlice.

References

External links

Prague-East District profile on the Czech Statistical Office's website

 
Districts of the Czech Republic